The 65th Infantry Division—nicknamed the "Battle-Axe Division"—was an infantry division of the United States Army that served in World War II. Its shoulder patch is a white halberd on a blue shield.

The entire length of Pennsylvania Route 65 is named the 65th Infantry Division Memorial Highway in its honor.

The United States Military Academy's home basketball arena at West Point is named Christl Arena in honor of 1LT Edward C. Christl, who served with the division during World War II and was killed in action in Austria on May 4, 1945.

World War II

 Activated: 16 August 1943 at Camp Shelby, Mississippi
 Overseas: 10 January 1945.
 Campaigns: Rhineland, Central Europe.
 Days of combat: 55.
 Awards: 
Medal of Honor - 1 Private First Class (Frederick C. Murphy), Medical Detachment, 259th Infantry, Siegfried Line at Saarlautern, Germany, 18 March 1945.
Distinguished Service Cross - 6
Distinguished Service Medal - 1
Silver Star Medal - 77
Legion of Merit - 14
Soldier's Medal - 4
 Bronze Star Medal - 686
 Air Medal - 19
 Commanders: Major General Stanley Eric Reinhart (August 1943 – 1 August 1945) and Brig. Gen. John E. Copeland (1 August 1945 to disbandment).
 Disbanded: 31 August 1945 in Germany.

Combat chronicle
The 65th Infantry Division landed at Le Havre, France, 21 January 1945, and proceeded to Camp Lucky Strike, where training continued until 1 March, when the division moved forward to relieve the 26th Infantry Division. First elements entered the line, 5 March 1945, and the division as a whole took over aggressive defense of the sector along the Saar, from Orscholz to Wadgassen, on 8 March 1945. On 17 March, the division attacked across the Saar, crossing the river at Dillingen and captured Saarlautern, 19 March, as Siegfried Line defenses cracked. Capturing Neunkirchen, 21 March 1945, the division raced to the Rhine, crossed the river at Oppenheim, 30 March, and ran into heavy German resistance and counterattacks. Langensalza fell on 5 April, Struth on the 7th, and Neumarkt on the 22nd.

Continuing its advance against crumbling German opposition, the division crossed the Danube 4 miles below Regensburg, 26 April, took the city, 27 April, seized Passau, cross the Inn River, 4 May, and occupied Linz, Austria, on the 5th. Germans surrendered en masse. On 9 May, as hostilities officially ended in Europe, the troops of the 65th made contact with the Russians at Erlauf.

Order of Battle
 Headquarters, 65th Infantry Division
 259th Infantry Regiment
 260th Infantry Regiment
 261st Infantry Regiment
 Headquarters and Headquarters Battery, 65th Infantry Division Artillery
 720th Field Artillery Battalion (155 mm)
 867th Field Artillery Battalion (105 mm)
 868th Field Artillery Battalion (105 mm)
 869th Field Artillery Battalion (105 mm)
 265th Engineer Combat Battalion
 365th Medical Battalion
 65th Cavalry Reconnaissance Troop (Mechanized)
 Headquarters, Special Troops, 65th Infantry Division
 Headquarters Company, 65th Infantry Division
 765th Ordnance Light Maintenance Company
 65th Quartermaster Company 
 565th Signal Company 
 Military Police Platoon
 Band
 65th Counterintelligence Corps Detachment

Attached Units
707th Tank Battalion (attached 6 Apr 45 only)
748th Tank Battalion (attached 7 Apr 45-past 9 May 45)
749th Tank Battalion (attached 29 Mar 45-6 Apr 45)
691st Tank Destroyer Battalion (attached 4 Mar 45-6 Apr 45)
808th Tank Destroyer Battalion (attached 5 Apr 45-past 9 May 45) 
546th AAA Automatic Weapons Battalion (attached 4 Mar 45-past 9 May 45)

Source: Order of Battle: U.S. Army World War II by Shelby Stanton.

Casualties
Total battle casualties: 1,230
Killed in action: 233
Wounded in action: 927
Missing in action: 3
Prisoner of war: 67

Assignments in ETO
25 January 1945: Fifteenth Army, 12th Army Group.
1 March 1945: XX Corps, Third Army, 12th Army Group.
4 April 1945: VIII Corps.
17 April 1945: XX Corps.

References

External links
 65th Infantry Division Association
 "Right to be Proud: History of the 65th Infantry Division's March Across Germany" (World War II unit history booklet published in 1945)

065th Infantry Division, U.S.
Infantry Division, U.S. 065
Military units and formations established in 1943
Military units and formations disestablished in 1945
Infantry divisions of the United States Army in World War II